The Directorate General of Civil Aviation (Direktorat Jenderal Perhubungan Udara) is a Directorate General under the control of the Ministry of Transportation of the Republic of Indonesia, which oversees the administration of civil aviation throughout the nation. The office of the Directorate General of Civil Aviation oversees all government regulations pertaining to civil aviation and the Aviation Act (Undang Undang Nomor 1 Tahun 2009 Tentang Penerbangan). Its headquarters is in Jakarta.

History

Structure
Ministry of Transportation
 The Directorate General of Civil Aviation (Direktorat Jenderal Perhubungan Udara)
 Secretariat of the Directorate General of Civil Aviation
 Directorate of Air Transport
 Directorate of Airports
 Directorate of Aviation Security
 Directorate of Air Navigation
 Directorate of Airworthiness and Operation

Functions
 Fulfilling standard of safety, security and service to the aviation industry
 Providing infrastructure and a reliable, optimum and integrated air transportation network
 Facilitation of a competitive and sustainable aviation service business
 To provide effective and efficient organisational support, manage the available resources of the agency and deliver comprehensive regulation and enforcement

Task

The Directorate General of Civil Aviation shall perform the following functions :
 Preparing the formulation of policies of the Ministry of Transportation on the field of air transportation, airports, flight security, air navigation, aircraft airworthiness and operation;
 Implementing policies on air transportation, airports, flight security, air navigation, aircraft airworthiness and operation;
 preparing standardisation, norms, guidance, criteria, system and procedures for air transportation, airports, flight security, air navigation, aircraft airworthiness and operation;
 performing certification and/or licensing on air transportation, airports, flight security, air navigation, aircraft airworthiness and operation;
 supervising (in the sense of monitoring and assessment) the implementation of policies on air transportation, airports, flight security, air *navigation, aircraft airworthiness and operation;
 controlling (in the sense of providing directives, guidance, technical guidance on the implementation of policies in air transportation, airports, flight security, air navigation, aircraft airworthiness and operation;
 law enforcement/corrective actions with respect to the implementation of policies in air transportation, airports, flight security, air navigation, aircraft airworthiness and operation;
 evaluating and reporting the implementation of policies in air transportation, airports, flight security, air navigation, aircraft airworthiness and operation;
 carrying out administrative affairs on the Directorate General of Civil Aviation

See also

 National Transportation Safety Committee
 Civil aviation authority

References

External links
 

Government agencies of Indonesia
Transport organizations based in Indonesia
Indonesia
Civil aviation in Indonesia